Aaron Beng Yao Cheng is a Singaporean two-star rear-admiral who served as Chief of Navy from 2020 to 2023. He will become Singapore's 11th Chief of Defence Force from 24 March 2023.

Education
Upon his graduation from Hwa Chong Institution in 2000, Beng was awarded the President’s Scholarship and the Singapore Armed Forces Overseas Scholarship, to studying at Yale University, where he graduated with a Bachelor of Science degree.

Military career
Beng enlisted into the SAF in 2000. He was Commanding Officer of the frigate RSS Intrepid and subsequently Commanding Officer of the Frigate Squadron. He was also Director of the Defence Policy Office.

Beng was appointed Fleet Commander in March 2019, before being appointed Chief of Staff – Naval Staff in November 2019. He was appointed Chief of Navy on 23 March 2020. He will later become Chief of Defence Force from 24 March 2023.

Awards and Decorations
  Pingat Pentadbiran Awam, Perak (Tentera) (Public Administration Medal, Silver (Military)) - PPA(P)
  Singapore Armed Forces Long Service and Good Conduct (20 Years) Medal
  Singapore Armed Forces Long Service and Good Conduct (10 Years) Medal with 15 year clasp
  Singapore Armed Forces Good Service Medal
  Singapore Armed Forces Overseas Service Medal
Naval Warfare Badge
MARSEC Boarding Skills Badge
Craft Coxswain Skill Badge

References 

Living people
Place of birth missing (living people)
Chiefs of the Republic of Singapore Navy
Yale University alumni
1982 births
21st-century Singaporean people